Zhu Yongbiao (born 12 March 1976) is a Chinese cyclist. He competed in the men's cross-country mountain biking event at the 2004 Summer Olympics.

References

1976 births
Living people
Chinese male cyclists
Olympic cyclists of China
Cyclists at the 2004 Summer Olympics
Place of birth missing (living people)
Cyclists at the 2002 Asian Games
Asian Games medalists in cycling
Medalists at the 2002 Asian Games
Asian Games silver medalists for China
21st-century Chinese people